Hydrangea bretschneideri is a species of flowering plant in the family Hydrangeaceae, native to most of China.

Discovered in the mountains around Beijing, China by Dr. Bretschneider in 1882. Hydrangea bretschneideri is a sturdy, bushy, deciduous scrub with peeling chestnut-brown bark. In the summer its blooms consist of ten or more large white flowers that turn pinkish with age.

References

Flora of China: Hydrangea bretschneideri

Flora of China
bretschneideri